Leslie Holligan (3 August 1978 – 15 September 2007) was a Guyanese footballer who last played for Caledonia AIA.

Career
He played for Beacon FC, Camptown FC and Alpha United and had stints with Notre Dame of Barbados and Caledonia AIA in the T&T Pro League.

International career
Holligan was a member of the Guyana national football team and played fourteen games. He was a starting member of Guyana's Digicel Cup team 2006 and represented the country since 1991 at U-19, U-21 and U-23 level.

Death
He died on 15 September 2007 at Georgetown Public Hospital and was buried ten days later in Georgetown, Guyana.

References

1978 births
2007 deaths
Sportspeople from Georgetown, Guyana
Guyanese footballers
Guyanese expatriate footballers
Guyana international footballers
TT Pro League players
Morvant Caledonia United players
North East Stars F.C. players
Expatriate footballers in Barbados
Notre Dame SC players
Guyanese expatriate sportspeople in Trinidad and Tobago
Expatriate footballers in Trinidad and Tobago
Association football defenders